The Bohío Formation (Tbo, Tbm) is a geologic formation in Panama. It preserves fossils dating back to the Late Eocene to Late Oligocene period.

Description 
The Bohío Formation is characterized by the presence of poorly sorted debris, mostly basaltic: very coarse debris in the form of boulders and cobbles, and finer debris forming beds of sandstone, and the matrix of conglomerate. The facies are non-marine, but marine fossils are found in thin units in the upper part of the formation, in algal limestone and in both poorly sorted and fairly well sorted subgraywacke. The Bohío Formation overlies the Gatuncillo Formation conformably in most areas, although may lap onto the Gatuncillo Formation or basement.

Smaller foraminifera from the basal part of the formation yielded an early Oligocene age. The upper part of the formation, from which the collections are derived yields larger foraminifera of late Oligocene age.

See also 

 List of fossiliferous stratigraphic units in Panama
 Postage stamps and postal history of the Canal Zone—Canal Zone Post office was located here

References

Bibliography 
 
 

Geologic formations of Panama
Paleogene Panama
Sandstone formations
Conglomerate formations
Siltstone formations
Formations
Formations